Minimum polynomial can refer to:
 Minimal polynomial (field theory)
 Minimal polynomial (linear algebra)